Deng Changyou (born February 1947) is a retired general of the People's Liberation Army Air Force (PLAAF) of China. He served as political commissar of the PLAAF.

Biography 
Born in Pengxi, Sichuan Province, Deng joined the PLA in March 1968, and the Chinese Communist Party in May 1970. In June 1990, he was appointed the director of the political department of the Air Force Ürümqi headquarters. In January 1993, he became the political commissar of the Air Force 9th corps. In July 1996, he was promoted to vice political commissar and secretary of discipline commission of the Lanzhou Military Region. In March 1997, he became the vice director of the political department of the PLA Air Force, and was promoted to director in November of the same year. In May 2002, he was promoted to political commissar of the PLA Air Force.  He was a member of the 16th and 17th Central Committees of the Chinese Communist Party.

References 

Living people
1947 births
People's Liberation Army generals from Sichuan
People from Suining
People's Liberation Army Air Force generals